Stanley Thomas Anderson (born 1953) is United States district judge of the United States District Court for the Western District of Tennessee.

Education and career

Born in Lexington, Tennessee, Anderson received a Bachelor of Science degree from the University of Tennessee in 1976 and a Juris Doctor from the University of Memphis School of Law in 1980. He was then in private practice in Tennessee until 1983, and again from 1987 to 2003, serving in the interim as an assistant commissioner of the Tennessee Department of Transportation from 1983 to 1985, and as a claims commissioner for the Tennessee Department of Treasury from 1985 to 1987.

Federal judicial service

In 2003, Anderson became a United States magistrate judge for the Western District of Tennessee. On September 6, 2007, he was nominated by President George W. Bush to a seat on the United States District Court for the Western District of Tennessee vacated by James Dale Todd. Anderson was confirmed by the United States Senate on April 10, 2008, and received his commission on May 21, 2008. He became Chief Judge on March 18, 2017 and served until January 20, 2023.

Sources

1953 births
Living people
Judges of the United States District Court for the Western District of Tennessee
United States district court judges appointed by George W. Bush
21st-century American judges
United States magistrate judges
University of Tennessee alumni
University of Memphis alumni